Maria Antonieta Portocarrero Thedim (née de Farias; 23 August 1922 – 3 March 2018), known professionally as Tônia Carrero, was a Brazilian actress.

Early life 
Carrero was born and raised in Rio de Janeiro, Brazil.

Career

She made her theater debut at the Brazilian Theater of Comedy (TBC) in São Paulo, with the play Um Deus Dormiu Lá em Casa, opposite actor Paulo Autran. Later she formed with her husband Adolfo Celi, and Autran, the Tonia-Celi-Autran Company (CTCA), which in the 1950s and 1960s revolutionized the Brazilian theater scene by performing a wide repertoire from classical pieces by Shakespeare and Carlo Goldoni to avant-garde works such as Sartre.

Selected filmography 
 1952 Tico-Tico no Fubá
 1961 Alias Gardelito (aka Alias Big Shot) - as wife.
 1962 Carnival of Crime 
 1962 Copacabana Palace
 1970 Pigmalião 70
 1970 A Próxima Atração
 1971 O Cafona
 1972 O Primeiro Amor
 1972 Uma Rosa com Amor
 1980 Água Viva (TV series) - as Stella Simpson.
 1983 Louco Amor
 1987 Sassaricando
 1989 Kananga do Japão
 1995 Sangue do Meu Sangue
 2004 Um Só Coração
 2004 Senhora do Destino
 2007 The Ballroom

References

External links

1922 births
2018 deaths
Actresses from Rio de Janeiro (city)
Brazilian film actresses
Brazilian telenovela actresses
Brazilian television actresses